Rhys Wakefield is an Australian actor and director, known for his roles in Australian TV series Home and Away, the feature film  The Black Balloon (2008) and in season 3 of HBO's True Detective in 2019.

Wakefield's debut feature film as director, Berserk, was released in American cinemas on 5 April 2019. He is also the director and co-creator of sci-fi podcast series, From Now, which is being developed into a TV Series with Amazon Studios.

Early life and education
Wakefield was born in Cairns, Queensland, to a medical standards officer mother and a father who serves in the navy. Before appearing as Lucas in Home and Away, Wakefield had been acting for more than six years. He attended classes at McDonald College of Performing Arts where he won the acting scholarship in 2003, during which time he performed in numerous Shakespeare festivals, working with both Opera Australia and the Australian Ballet. Wakefield graduated in 2006.

Career
His first professional acting role was on the Australian TV series Don't Blame Me, where he appeared in two episodes.

In August 2005, Wakefield was cast as Lucas Holden in the long-running Australian soap opera Home and Away. His character was the youngest child of the Holden family until his father Tony and stepmother Rachel had his baby brother Harry. His performance on the series led to a Logie nomination for 'Best New Talent' in 2006. During his time on the show he was involved in a controversial storyline which led the Australian broadcasting regulator (ACMA) to conclude that scenes had breached the Australian broadcasting code, a finding which was responsible for the series being re-classified as PG.

Wakefield played his first leading role in a feature film in The Black Balloon as Thomas Mollison which led to a nomination for Best Actor by the Australian Film Institute and the Australian Film Critics Circle. The film opened on 6 March 2008 in Australia after premiering at the Berlin International Film Festival in Germany, where it received the Crystal Bear as the best feature-length film in the Generation 14plus category.

Wakefield has played the lead in Sanctum, the Polite Leader in The Purge franchise, and as Dick Cheney in The First Lady.

As a filmmaker, Wakefield co-wrote and directed the short film A Man Walks Into a Bar which was a finalist at the 2013 Tropfest International Short Film Festival in Sydney. His screenplay, entitled Please Close the Gate was a feature finalist at the 2016 Cinequest Film Festival Screenwriting competition and was officially selected for the Beverly Hills Film festival that same year.

Wakefield plays Freddy Burns in season 3 of HBO's True Detective. 

Wakefield's first directed feature film, Berserk, was released in American cinemas on 5 April 2019. It stars Nick Cannon, James Roday, Nora Arnezeder, Erin Moriarty and Jack Falahee and was executive produced by Brian Kavanaugh-Jones. The film was partially based on someone trying to break into Wakefield's home. Wakefield also co-wrote and produced the film with William Day Frank.

Wakefield was listed by TVLine as one of their 'Breakout Stars to Watch' for his leading performance as Matty in Reprisal on Hulu.

In 2021, it was announced that Amazon Studios won rights to adapt QCode sci-fi podcast series, From Now, as a TV series. Golden Globe winners Richard Madden (Game of Thrones) and Brian Cox (Succession) will serve as executive producers. The podcast series, which stars Cox and Madden, debuted in late December 2020 and peaked at number two overall in the Apple Podcast global charts. The podcast was created by Wakefield and William Day Frank. The duo will adapt the series for TV. In an interview with the Wall Street Journal, Wakefield said that from the beginning they had planned for the podcast "to come to the screen eventually".

Accolades
Wakefield was nominated for Best Actor in a Feature Film by the Australian Film Institute and the Film Critics Circle of Australia for his performance in The Black Balloon. His AFI nomination for Best Actor in The Black Balloon is Australia's equivalent of the Academy Awards. Wakefield was nominated against Guy Pearce, William McInnes and David Roberts. The Australian Film Institute is now known as the Australian Academy of Cinema and Television Arts (AACTA) Awards.

Filmography

Film

Television

Short films

References

External links

 

1988 births
20th-century Australian male actors
21st-century Australian male actors
Australian male child actors
Australian male film actors
Australian male soap opera actors
Living people
People from Cairns
Australian expatriate male actors in the United States
Male actors from Queensland